The Leech Lake Reservation (Gaa-zagaskwaajimekaag in the Ojibwe language) is an Indian reservation located in the north-central Minnesota counties of Cass, Itasca, Beltrami, and Hubbard. The reservation forms the land base for the federally recognized Leech Lake Band of Ojibwe, one of six bands comprising the Minnesota Chippewa Tribe, organized in 1934. The Leech Lake Reservation has the second highest population of any reservation in Minnesota with White Earth Nation being the largest Minnesota Ojibwe tribe, Leech Lake Nation has a resident population of 11,388 indicated by the 2020 census.

History
The Leech Lake Reservation was not established in a single legislative act. Rather, it grew from the amalgamation of multiple treaties, executive orders, and various articles of legislation spanning many decades. The core areas of the reservation were established by the 1855 treaty of Washington, which formed three smaller reservations for the Pillager Band of Chippewa Indians at Leech Lake, Cass Lake, and Lake Winnibigoshish. These reservations were reshaped and consolidated by new treaties in 1864 and 1867, when the United States sought with little success to concentrate Ojibwes from other reservations together at a single location. The reservation was further modified by several executive orders in the 1870s, one of which created the White Oak Point reservation of the Mississippi Band.

Under the Dawes Act of 1887 and the Nelson Act of 1889, the United States allotted tribal land on the Ojibwe reservations into private parcels. Some parcels were held by individual tribal members, but much of the reservation was alienated into the ownership of timber companies and white settlers. In addition, the United States established what became the Chippewa National Forest in the early twentieth century on the remaining unallotted tribal land. As a result, by 1934, less than 5% of the reservation was still in Ojibwe ownership.

Following the Indian Reorganization Act of 1934, the present "Greater" Leech Lake Indian Reservation was formed from the merger of the Leech Lake, Cass Lake, and Lake Winnibigoshish reservations of the Pillager Band, the Chippewa Indian Reservation of the Lake Superior Band, and the White Oak Point reservation of the Mississippi Band.  A minimal percentage of reservation land is owned by citizens of the Band; additionally, most of the reservation remains within the Chippewa National Forest, making settlement expansion extremely difficult.

Geography

About one-fourth of the reservation is covered by lakes. The largest lakes on the reservation are Leech Lake, Lake Winnibigoshish, and Cass Lake. The band uses 40 lakes for the production of wild rice, and the community produces more rice than any other reservation in the state. The reservation is the second-largest in Minnesota (after the White Earth Indian Reservation) in terms of land area, and the largest in terms of total area.

Communities
The reservation consists of eleven villages; two additional communities have a substantial number of Leech Lake Band members. Nearly all Leech Lake communities are located in or near the woods of the Chippewa National Forest. The largest community is Cass Lake, situated on the southwestern shores of the eponymous lake. The next largest settlements are Ball Club, Onigum, Inger, and Bena. In some communities, housing is located along only one road, with each side lined with homes.

Ah-gwah-ching (part)
Baker
Ball Club
Bena
Benedict (part)
Brevik
Cass Lake
Deer River (part)
Dunbar
Inger
Longville (part)
Max
Mission
Oak Point
Onigum
Oslund
Pennington
Ryan Village
Smokey Point
Squaw Lake
Sugar Point
Whipholt
Wilkinson

Demographics
As of the census of 2020, the population of the Leech Lake Reservation was 11,388.

The Leech Lake Reservation has a significant non-native population due in part to the allotment and sale of reservation lands in the late nineteenth century. In 2020, the racial makeup of the reservation was 49.3% White, 43.8% Native American, 0.1% Black or African American, 0.1% Asian, 0.4% from other races, and 6.3% from two or more races. Ethnically, the population was 1.7% Hispanic or Latino of any race.

Education
There are two tribal schools, Bug-O-Nay-Ge-Shig School and Leech Lake Tribal College.

See also

 Battle of Sugar Point
 Bryan v. Itasca County
 Leech Lake Tribal College
 List of historical Indian reservations in the United States
 List of largest Indian reservations
 Minnesota Indian Affairs Council
 Palace Bingo and Casino

References

External links

Further reading
 
 
 

American Indian reservations in Minnesota
Anishinaabe reservations and tribal-areas in the United States
Populated places in Beltrami County, Minnesota
Populated places in Cass County, Minnesota
Populated places in Hubbard County, Minnesota
Populated places in Itasca County, Minnesota
Ojibwe reserves and reservations
Native American tribes in Minnesota
Leech Lake
Minnesota populated places on the Mississippi River
Ojibwe in Minnesota